Ravel is a crater on Mercury. Its name was adopted by the International Astronomical Union (IAU) in 1985, after the French composer Maurice Ravel.

References

Impact craters on Mercury